Aporodes pygmaealis is a moth of the family Crambidae described by Hans Georg Amsel in 1961. It is found mostly in Iran.

External links

Moths described in 1961
Odontiini
Moths of Asia